Mohr Siebeck Verlag is a long-established academic publisher focused on the humanities and social sciences and based in Tübingen, Germany. An independent publisher, it has remained in the same family over four generations.

Founded in 1801 in Frankfurt am Main as the Hermann'sche Buchhandlung, the publishing house consisted of a press and retail book trade. In 1805, it became the university bookshop in Heidelberg. Still today, it specializes in the traditional subjects of theology and law but now publishes in a range of fields across the humanities, including ancient studies, Judaic studies, religious studies, history, philosophy, sociology, and economics.

History

Frankfurt and Heidelberg 
On August 1, 1801, August Hermann founded a publisher in Frankfurt, which operated as both a press and a retailer of books. Jacob Christian Benjamin Mohr took over the publishing house in 1804, and one year later, he and Johann Georg Zimmer founded the academic publishing house Mohr & Zimmer, which still contained both a publishing and retail division. In 1811 the Frankfurt branch was closed, and in 1815 Zimmer withdrew as partner, being replaced by Christian Friedrich Winter. In 1822, Mohr parted with Winter and continued the publishing house under the name J.C.B. Mohr. Winter continued business on his own, as Winter University Press.

In 1825, J.C.B. Mohr co-founded the German Publishers and Booksellers Association in Leipzig, serving as its head from 1838 to 1840. After his death, in 1854, the company went to his sons.

Intermezzo in Tübingen
Since 1816, Tübingen had been home to H. Laupp'sche Buchhandlung, the publishing house of Heinrich Laupp. Coming out of the university bookseller Cotta'schen Verlagsbuchhandlung, it functioned as both a press and retailer of books, as was common at the time. Laupp's son-in-law – the Leipzig bookseller Hermann Siebeck – became partner in 1840 and sole proprietor in 1866. Following Siebeck's death, in 1877, his own son-in-law, J.G. Kötzle, and his son, Paul Siebeck, led the company together. In 1878, they acquired the publisher J.C.B. Mohr, then in Heidelberg, and transferred it to Tübingen.

Freiburg im Breisgau
In 1880, Paul Siebeck took the operations of J.C.B. Mohr Verlag and some of those from the H. Laupp'schen Buchhandlung to Freiburg im Breisgau, naming the new publishing house "Akademische Buchhandlung von J.C.B. Mohr (Paul Siebeck)." There, the publisher focused its program on liberal theology, the philosophy of Southwest neo-Kantianism, constitutional law, civil law, and "national economics" (first that of the Historical school of economics and then the reformers around Max Weber). Soon afterwards, the publishing house expanded its sphere of influence from the three southwestern universities of University of Freiburg, University of Tübingen, and Heidelberg University into all of Germany. By the turn of the 20th century, it had already expanded with numerous international contacts.

Return to Tübingen 

In 1899, Paul Siebeck returned to Tübingen with his publishing house, taking over the administration of H. Laupp'schen Buchhandlung and discontinuing the book retail division. His oldest son, Oskar Siebeck, jointed the company in 1906. Upon the sudden death of Paul Siebeck, in 1920, Oskar and his brother, Werner Siebeck, took the helm. In the wake of crisis, caused by a reduction in funding for science and education and by Hyperinflation in the Weimar Republic, the program streamlined, specializing in the four core subjects of theology, philosophy, law, and economics – which remain its focus today.

1930–1960s 
Following the Nazi seizure of power and rise of Nazism, the publishing program of Mohr (Siebeck) – with its numerous Jewish and left-leaning authors – was no longer popular politically, with sales sinking down to one-tenth. When the two brothers died, Oskar Siebeck's son, Hans-Georg, assumed leadership of the now heavily downsized publisher, in 1936. Between 1939 and 1945, hardly any books were published. In the wake of World War II, however, the publisher received one of the first licenses within the French zone of Allied-occupied Germany and began book production once more. After 12 years of isolation, international relationships had to be established anew. During the 1960s, through its association with the Leo Baeck Institute, Mohr (Siebeck) expanded its publishing program to include Jewish studies. The publisher again became socially acceptable on the international stage.

Present 
In 1972, Georg Siebeck joined the publishing house. Initially, he assumed management alone, but in 2005, Franz Peter-Gillig and Henning Ziebritzki came on board. Since Georg Siebeck withdrew from his management role, at the end of 2014, Peter-Gilig and Ziebritzki have led the publisher. The internationalization of scholarship has also shaped the development of Mohr Siebeck's publishing program: the number of  non-German authors has increased exponentially; multilingual book series have emerged; editorial committees now include international scholars; and some journals appear exclusively in English. Furthermore, major projects, like the reference work Religion in Geschichte und Gegenwart have been organized through international cooperation. Since the mid 1980s, Electronic publishing and the internet have assumed a greater role in publication.

The company's archives were given in 2010 to the Staatsbibliothek zu Berlin.

Major works, important book series, and journals

Further reading

References

Academic publishing companies
Book publishing companies of Germany
German companies established in 1801
Companies based in Baden-Württemberg
Publishing companies established in 1801